Jānis Lācis (Yan Yanovich Latsis; February 20, 1897 – March 10, 1937) was a Latvian Riflemen, later Soviet division commander and Komkor (corps commander). 

Lacis fought in the 4th Vidzeme Latvian Riflemen Regiment of the Imperial Russian Army in World War I before going over to the Bolsheviks in the subsequent civil war. He was a recipient of the Order of Lenin and the Order of the Red Banner. From 1932 to 1937, he commanded the troops guarding the railways of Siberia and the Far East. He was simultaneously a member of the Central Executive Committee of the Russian Soviet Federative Socialist Republic. He died of an illness in Khabarovsk. He is buried at Novodevichy Cemetery.

1897 births
1937 deaths
People from Cēsis Municipality
People from Kreis Wenden
Russian Social Democratic Labour Party members
Old Bolsheviks
Communist Party of the Soviet Union members
Latsis
Latvian Riflemen
Russian military personnel of World War I
Soviet military personnel of the Russian Civil War
Recipients of the Order of Lenin
Recipients of the Order of the Red Banner
Burials at Novodevichy Cemetery